Live Around the World is the second (first internationally) live album by Queen + Adam Lambert, released on 2 October 2020 by Hollywood Records in North America and EMI worldwide. It is a compilation of songs performed at various shows between June 2014 and February 2020. The album was also released on DVD and Blu-ray with additional songs omitted on the CD and vinyl releases.

Track listings

CD and vinyl

DVD

Personnel
 Freddie Mercury – lead vocals (archival footage from Live at Wembley during "Ay-Ohs" and "Love of My Life")
 Brian May – guitar, backing and lead vocals
 Roger Taylor – drums, percussion, backing and lead vocals
 Adam Lambert – lead vocals
 Spike Edney – piano, keyboards, synth, vocoder, backing vocals
 Neil Fairclough – bass guitar, backing vocals
 Tyler Warren – percussion, additional drums, backing vocals (on songs from 2017-2020 performances)
 Rufus Tiger Taylor – percussion, additional drums, backing vocals (on songs from 2014-2017 performances)

Charts

Weekly charts

Year-end charts

Certifications

References

2020 live albums
Queen + Adam Lambert
Hard rock albums by American artists
Hard rock albums by British artists
Glam rock albums by British artists
Glam rock albums by American artists
Hollywood Records live albums